Hem Kiry (born April 11, 1980) is a Cambodian former swimmer, who specialized in sprint freestyle events. He is a two-time Olympian (2000 and 2004), and served twice as Cambodia's flag bearer in the opening ceremony. He also held a Cambodian record of 26.48 in the 50 m freestyle from the Southeast Asian Games. Hem is currently working as a swimming coach for the Cambodia national team.

Hem made his official debut at the 2000 Summer Olympics in Sydney, where he competed in the men's 50 m freestyle. Swimming in heat two, he posted a lifetime best of 26.41 to earn a fifth spot and sixty-sixth overall by a 1.08-second margin behind winner Jamie Peterkin of Saint Lucia.

At the 2004 Summer Olympics in Athens, Hem swam for the second time in the 50 m freestyle. As part of an Olympic Solidarity program, he received a Universality place from FINA in an entry time of 27.56. He challenged seven other swimmers in heat three, including 16-year-old Chris Hackel of Mauritius. He edged out Libya's Khaled Ghezzawi to take another fifth spot by six hundredths of a second in 27.49. Hem failed to advance into the semifinals, as he placed seventieth overall out of 86 swimmers in the preliminaries.

He is a son of Hem Thon (1943–2015), who was also a swimmer. His siblings, sister Hem Raksmey and brother Hem Thon Ponloeu are also swimmers.

References

External links
 
Profile – ICECP (International Coaching Enrichment Certificate Program)

1980 births
Living people
Cambodian male freestyle swimmers
Olympic swimmers of Cambodia
Swimmers at the 2000 Summer Olympics
Swimmers at the 2004 Summer Olympics
Sportspeople from Phnom Penh
Swimmers at the 1998 Asian Games
Swimmers at the 2002 Asian Games
Asian Games competitors for Cambodia